David Augusto Paniagua Yépez (born 30 April 1959) is a Bolivian footballer. He played in five matches for the Bolivia national football team from 1979 to 1985. He was also part of Bolivia's squad for the 1979 Copa América tournament.

References

External links
 

1959 births
Living people
Bolivian footballers
Bolivia international footballers
Place of birth missing (living people)
Association football forwards
The Strongest players
Club Blooming players
Club Bolívar players
1979 Copa América players